CCM Kirumba Stadium is a multi-purpose stadium in Mwanza, Tanzania. It has a capacity of 35,000 and is the second largest stadium in the country after the National Stadium in Dar es Salaam

Matches
The Tanzania national football team has played many friendlies at this stadium. 

The Tanzania national football team played a friendly game in the stadium against Malawi on 29 March 2015. The match resulted in a 1-1 draw. 

It has been the home of Mwanza football teams that play in Tanzanian Premier League and in the Tanzanian First Division League.

References

External links
 
CCM Kirumba Stadium at National-football-teams.com

Football venues in Tanzania
Mwanza
Chama Cha Mapinduzi
Buildings and structures in the Mwanza Region